Marcel Martel (February 1, 1925 – April 13, 1999) was a French Canadian singer-songwriter and composer. Born in Drummondville, Quebec, and playing country music since childhood, Martel first found success in 1947 with his songs "La Chaine de nos coeurs" and "Souvenir de mon enfance". Over the course of a thirty five-year career he released nearly two hundred records, frequently collaborating with his wife Noëlla Therrien, his daughter Renée Martel, and fellow Québécois country singer Paul Brunelle.

He also had a small acting role, appearing as himself, in the 1972 film The Wise Guys (Les Smattes).

Further reading 
 Boulanger, André (1983). Marcel Martel: au jardin de mes souveinrs. Montreal: Editions de montagne.

References

External links
 
 
 Entry at thecanadianencyclopedia.ca

1925 births
1999 deaths
French Quebecers
Canadian country singer-songwriters
People from Drummondville
Canadian male singer-songwriters
Musicians from Quebec
20th-century Canadian male singers